Cyclotrachelus torvus is a species of woodland ground beetle in the family Carabidae. It is found in North America.

Subspecies
These two subspecies belong to the species Cyclotrachelus torvus:
 Cyclotrachelus torvus deceptus (Casey, 1918)
 Cyclotrachelus torvus torvus (LeConte, 1863)

References

Further reading

 

Pterostichinae
Articles created by Qbugbot
Beetles described in 1863
Beetles of North America